Andreas Mircea Mihaiu (born 19 August 1998) is a Romanian professional footballer who plays as a right winger for Liga I club Chindia Târgoviște.

Early career
Mihaiu was born in Slatina and start playing football for a local team. In 2015, he was noticed in a youth game by Ionel Dănciulescu, Mugurel Cornățeanu (ex-coach at Dinamo II) and Gabriel Răduță (head of Dinamo's Academy) and bought to Dinamo București.

Career statistics

Club

Honours
Chindia Târgoviște
Liga II: 2018–19

References

External links
 

1998 births
Living people
Sportspeople from Slatina, Romania
Romanian footballers
Liga III players
Liga II players
Liga I players
AFC Turris-Oltul Turnu Măgurele players
AFC Chindia Târgoviște players
FC Dinamo București players
Association football midfielders